Gert Lundqvist (16 February 1937 – 2001) was a Swedish footballer who played as a defender.

References

Association football defenders
Swedish footballers
Allsvenskan players
Malmö FF players
1937 births
2001 deaths